Carl Sjöblom (2 July 1911 – 10 May 1977) was a Swedish rower. He competed in the men's coxed four at the 1936 Summer Olympics.

References

1911 births
1977 deaths
Swedish male rowers
Olympic rowers of Sweden
Rowers at the 1936 Summer Olympics
Sportspeople from Stockholm